Cărbunari is a commune in Caraș-Severin County, western Romania, with a population of 1,282 people. It is composed of two villages, Cărbunari and Știnăpari (Máriahavas).

References

Communes in Caraș-Severin County
Localities in Romanian Banat